The Queen's Regiment (QUEENS) was an infantry regiment of the British Army formed in 1966.

Several other regiments in the British Army have held the title of "Queen's Regiment":

 A royalist Queen's Regiment of Horse that took part in English Civil War and was heavily defeated at Shelford Priory, Nottinghamshire, in 1645
 2nd Dragoon Guards (Queen's Bays), known as the Queen's Regiment of Dragoon Guards, formed in 1685
 Queen's Regiment of Foot, a previous (1685) name of the King's Own Royal Regiment (Lancaster)
 Queen's Regiment of Horse, a previous (1685) name of the 1st King's Dragoon Guards
 Queen's Royal Regiment (West Surrey) was a line infantry regiment of the English and later the British Army from 1661 to 1959
 16th The Queen's Lancers, a cavalry regiment of the British Army formed in 1759
 105th Regiment of Foot (Queen's Own Royal Regiment of Highlanders) of the later Seven Years' War
 The Queen's Regiment of Light Infantry Militia, a previous (1850s) name of the Queen's Edinburgh Light Infantry Militia
 16th/5th The Queen's Royal Lancers, a cavalry regiment of the British Army formed in 1922

Military units and formations disambiguation pages